Godairone Modingwane (born 26 June 1996) is a Botswana football midfielder who currently plays for Botswana Defence Force XI.

References

1996 births
Living people
Botswana footballers
Botswana Defence Force XI F.C. players
Association football midfielders
Botswana international footballers